The 1900 Prince Edward Island general election was held in the Canadian province of Prince Edward Island on December 12, 1900.

The election was won by the governing Liberals, led by incumbent Premier Donald Farquharson. Farquharson would later give up his office in 1901 to run successfully for federal office. He was succeeded by Arthur Peters, who previously served as the province's Attorney General.

The opposition Conservatives, led by Daniel Gordon, lost two seats. This was Gordon's final election before stepping down as Conservative leader in 1903 - he was succeeded by John A. Mathieson

Party standings

Members Elected

The Legislature of Prince Edward Island had two levels of membership from 1893 to 1996 - Assemblymen and Councillors. This was a holdover from when the Island had a bicameral legislature, the General Assembly and the Legislative Council.

In 1893, the Legislative Council was abolished and had its membership merged with the Assembly, though the two titles remained separate and were elected by different electoral franchises. Assembleymen were elected by all eligible voters of within a district, while Councillors were only elected by landowners within a district.

Kings

Prince

Queens

Sources

1900 elections in Canada
Elections in Prince Edward Island
1900 in Prince Edward Island
December 1900 events